Desert Eagle Observatory (code: 333) is a private amateur astronomical observatory, situated near Benson, Arizona, United States. Operated by Canadian amateur astronomer William Kwong Yu Yeung, the observatory's primary purpose is the observation and discovery of comets and minor planets, which include asteroids and near-Earth objects. At the observatory, Bill Yeung has discovered more than 1,500 minor planets.

See also
 List of astronomical observatories

Notes

External links 
 Desert Eagle Observatory Homepage

Astronomical observatories in Arizona
Buildings and structures in Cochise County, Arizona